Michael Terry Evans (born January 19, 1982) is an American former professional baseball outfielder.

Evans was traded from the St. Louis Cardinals to the Los Angeles Angels of Anaheim in return for pitcher Jeff Weaver on July 5, .

He debuted on June 17, striking out in a pinch-hit appearance against the Los Angeles Dodgers. On June 20, he made his first career start in right field in his first home game.  It was Father's Day, and his father was in attendance. He later hit his first home run in his first plate appearance at home on a 3–1 count.

He is married to the former Tanner Cochran of Dublin, Georgia.  They have one child.

Although he began the 2010 season with the major league club, Evans was designated for assignment early on and sent outright to the minors on April 14.

After signing a minor league contract with the San Francisco Giants after 2010, he was released on June 1, 2011. He signed a minor league contract with the Philadelphia Phillies later that day and was assigned to the Double-A Reading Phillies.

References

External links

Venezuelan Professional Baseball League statistics

1982 births
Living people
Los Angeles Angels players
Baseball players from Georgia (U.S. state)
Bravos de Margarita players
American expatriate baseball players in Venezuela
Middle Georgia Warriors baseball players
Major League Baseball outfielders
Johnson City Cardinals players
Peoria Chiefs players
Springfield Cardinals players
Palm Beach Cardinals players
Arkansas Travelers players
Arizona League Angels players
Salt Lake Bees players
Fresno Grizzlies players
Reading Phillies players
Northwest Arkansas Naturals players
Omaha Storm Chasers players
People from Dublin, Georgia